Final 24 is a Canadian documentary series which airs on the Discovery Channel, Global Television Network, and OWN. Released in Canada in 2006, the series chronicles the last 24 hours of the lives of famous celebrities of the late 20th century. The series was narrated by Canadian voice artist Dave McRae for a US release in 2007 on the Biography Channel and by Danny Wallace in the UK.

Episodes

Season 1

Season 2

International broadcasters

 Australia - Seven HD - 10.30pm Mondays.
 Austria, Germany and Switzerland - Servus TV
 Germany - ZDFneo
 United Kingdom - Fox
 United States - The Biography Channel, Current TV
 Greece - ET3
 Italy - Discovery World
 Poland - Discovery World
 Romania - Investigation Discovery
 Hungary - Discovery World

External links
 

The Biography Channel shows
Discovery Channel (Canada) original programming
2000s Canadian documentary television series
2006 Canadian television series debuts
Television series by Cineflix
2007 Canadian television series endings